Liberty Billings (1823 - 1877) was an American officer in the Union Army, a Unitarian minister, and a state senator.

Billings was born in Saco, Maine in 1823. He was educated at Thornton Academy and later graduated from Meadville Theological School in 1848.

Billings served as Lieutenant Colonel of the 1st South Carolina Volunteer Infantry which in turn became the 33rd United States Colored Infantry during the American Civil War. He was a Republican (Radical Republican) during the Reconstruction Era and served as a state senator in Florida. He was involved in the constitutional convention that developed the 1868 Florida Constitution. Billings has been honored posthumously as a Great Floridian.

He was deemed ineligible to participate in the constitutional convention and was voted out along with others accused of being residents of other states.

The Billings House located in the Fernandina Beach Historic District in Fernandina Beach, Florida.

See also
African-American officeholders during and following the Reconstruction era

References

1823 births
1877 deaths
19th-century Unitarians
American Unitarians
People of Florida in the American Civil War
People of Maine in the American Civil War
African Americans in the American Civil War
Union Army colonels
Radical Republicans
Members of the Florida House of Representatives
People from Saco, Maine
African-American Christian clergy
African-American state legislators in Florida
Fernandina Beach, Florida
Thornton Academy alumni